Quentin is a primarily male given name.

Quentin or Quentins may also refer to:

 Quentin (surname)
 HMS Quentin (G78), a Second World War destroyer
 Quentin, Pennsylvania, a census-designated place
 Quentins, a 2002 novel by Maeve Binchy

See also
 
 San Quintin (disambiguation)
 Quintin, a commune in France